James Francis Conway (14 June 1925 – 28 December 2003) was an Australian rules football player and coach. He was inducted into the West Australian Football Hall of Fame in 2009.

Career
Born in North Fremantle, Conway originally played football for the North Fremantle team in the Ex-Scholars league. In August 1944, he enlisted in the Royal Australian Air Force as a Leading Aircraftman, and was stationed with the 12 Aircraft Repair Depot until June 1946, when he was discharged. On his return to Western Australia, Conway immediately resumed playing with East Fremantle, and again played in a premiership. He made his interstate debut for Western Australia in 1947, and the following season was appointed captain of East Fremantle, a role he would reprise in 1951 and 1956.

Playing mainly as a rover, and on occasion at centre half-forward, Conway won both East Fremantle's best and fairest award, the Lynn Medal, and the Sandover Medal for the best player in the competition in 1950. The following season he kicked 77 goals to be East Fremantle's leading goalkicker. Conway retired in 1956 having played 180 games for East Fremantle, kicking 343 goals, as well as representing Western Australia on 15 occasions, kicking 21 goals. In total, he record 78 Sandover Medal votes over his career. After his retirement, Conway was recruited as captain-coach of Coolamon in country New South Wales, taking over from ex- player Frank Treasure. In 1964,  signed Conway as coach, replacing Peter Pianto. After finishing last the previous two seasons, Claremont finished fourth in the regular season for 1964, with 12 wins and nine losses, qualifying for the finals. The club defeated  in the opening semi-final, and then went on to defeat  in the preliminary final, qualifying for the grand final against minor premiers East Fremantle, Conway's old team. In the grand final, Claremont defeated East Fremantle 14.18 (102) to 15.8 (98), to win their first premiership since 1940. Conway spent four more seasons in charge of Claremont, with the club making the finals in 1965 only. He also coached the state team on a number of occasions.

In 1997, Conway was included as the rover in East Fremantle's Team of the Century. He was included in the Fremantle Football Hall of Legends in 1998, and inducted into the West Australian Football Hall of Fame in 2009.

References

1925 births
2003 deaths
Royal Australian Air Force airmen
Claremont Football Club coaches
East Fremantle Football Club players
Royal Australian Air Force personnel of World War II
Sandover Medal winners
Australian rules footballers from Fremantle
West Australian Football Hall of Fame inductees
Military personnel from Western Australia